Garbey is a surname. Notable people with the surname include:

 Bárbaro Garbey (born 1956), American baseball player
 Marcia Garbey (born 1949), Cuban athlete
 Ramón Garbey (born 1971), Cuban boxer
 Rolando Garbey (born 1947), Cuban boxer

See also
 Garber (surname)